Novruz Ismayil oglu Mammadov (born 15 March 1947) is an Azerbaijani politician and translator who served as Prime Minister of Azerbaijan from April 2018 to October 2019. He previously held the title as assistant to the President for Foreign Policy Issues and Head of Department of Foreign Policy.

Early life 
He was born in Nakhchivan, in the Azerbaijan Soviet Socialist Republic. He received a PhD in Philology in 1991 from the Azerbaijani Pedagogical Foreign Languages Institute (APFLI) of the Azerbaijan University of Languages, where he then became an instructor.

In addition to Azerbaijani, he is also fluent in Russian, and French.

Career 
Between 1967 and 1981, he served as an interpreter in Algeria, and in Guinea. In 1992, he became the official dean of the preparatory faculty of APFLI and in 1993, became the dean of French language of APFLI, holding this position until 1997. In 1995, he became the interpreter to former Azerbaijani President Heydar Aliyev. From 1997 to 2018, he was Head of the Department of Foreign Relations of the Presidential Administration of Azerbaijan. On April 21, 2018 he was appointed as the Prime Minister of Azerbaijan by President Ilham Aliyev and left office on October 8, 2019.

Awards

Azerbaijan
 Shohrat Order (2007)
 Sharaf Order (2017)
 Rank of Ambassador extraordinary and plenipotentiary (2002)

Foreign Awards
 Legion d’Honneur (France, 1998)
 Polish Legion of Honor (Poland, 2009)
Order of Legion d’Honneur (France, 2019)

Publications 
Novruz Mammadov authored over 20 scientific articles and several books, including more than 300 articles dedicated to the political and public-political issues

He translated “A Myth of Terror” by Erich Feigl" into French in 2001.

References

External links
 More information

1947 births
Living people
Azerbaijani translators
Azerbaijan University of Languages alumni
Recipients of the Shohrat Order
Recipients of the Legion of Honour
Prime Ministers of Azerbaijan